Kangari may refer to:
 Kangari, Jiroft
 Kangari, Rabor